Richard O. Boyer (10 January 1903 – 7 August 1973) was an American freelance journalist.

Background

Richard Owen Boyer was born on January 10, 1903, in Chicago.

Career

Boyer worked a various newspapers, including the St. Louis Post Dispatch, Boston Herald, New Orleans Item, and Dallas Times Herald.

Boyer co-founders the Boston Newspaper Guild.  

He contributed to The New Yorker magazine during the 1930s and 1940s.

In the late 1940s, he was foreign correspondent for PM newspaper in Germany, France, Italy, and Central America.  He was also editor of U.S. Week.

In 1948, he was an editor of the cultural monthly magazine Masses & Mainstream.

Before appearing at a Senate hearing, he had written for the Daily Worker. He was implicated in Winston Burdett's June 1955 testimony before the Senate Internal Security Subcommittee hearings as a Communist. The Senate subpoenaed Boyer in November 1955 and he testified the next January.  At the hearing, Boyer refused to answer questions about his affiliations with the Communist Party, under the protection of the  First and Fifth Amendment. He was one of many witnesses in 1956 called by the Subcommittee in an "inquiry into New York press. To questions of whether he was a Communist or whether others were party members, the write invoked both his First and Fifth Amendments. Privately, however, Boyer identified himself as a Communist, saying that he had been a party member from the 1930s until 1956, when Nikita Khrushchev, the then Soviet leader, disclosed the secrets of the Stalin regime."

Death

Boyer died age 70 on August 7, 1973.

Works
 The Dark Ship (1947)
 If This Be Treason (1948)

References

External links
Time magazine article, January 16, 1956
Richard O. Boyer's obituary at the New York Times

1903 births
1973 deaths
American reporters and correspondents
American tax resisters
20th-century American non-fiction writers